Slavomir (Latin: Sclagamarus, Czech and Slovak: Slavomír) was a duke of Moravia (871). He led a revolt against the Franks who had annexed Moravia during the incarceration of his relative, Svatopluk I.

Early life 
Slavomir, according to the Annals of Fulda, was a member of the Moravian ruling dynasty. He seems to have been a disciple of Saints Cyril and Methodius who had in 863 arrived in Moravia where they established an institution of higher education.

It is possible that Slavomir was one of the "high-ranking hostages" whom his relative, Rastislav, the duke of Moravia, turned over to the Franks in 864, because in that year Bishop Otgar of Eichstätt granted an estate near the Frankish–Moravian border to a certain Slav, Sleimar, whose name may be a variant spelling of his name. It is conceivable that Louis the German, the king of East Francia, placed Slavomir-Sleimar under Bishop Otgar's supervision and granted him an estate as a prebend while he served as a pledge for Rastislav's loyalty.

Revolt against the Franks 

Rastislav was arrested and handed over to the Franks by his own nephew, Svatopluk I, in 869 or 870. However, Svatopluk himself was arrested in 870 on the order of the Louis the German's son, Carloman who appointed two Frankish lords, William and Engilschalk to rule over Moravia. Believing that Svatopluk was dead, the Moravians selected Slavomir to be their ruler. Since Slavomir had already been a priest, his election likely indicates that the Moravian ruling dynasty has run out of male heirs by that time.

With Slavomir in rebellion, Carloman decided to employ the common strategy of using one "barbarian" leader to wage war against another. For this purpose he released Svatopluk from prison, and sent him back to Moravia with a large Bavarian army to depose Slavomir. Once on the battlefield, however, Svatopluk bolted from the Frankish ranks, joined forces with Slavomir, and defeated the army he had just left. Therefore, Svatopluk became again the undisputed ruler of Moravia.

See also 
Great Moravia
Louis the German
Saints Cyril and Methodius
Svatopluk I

Notes

References 
 
 
 
 
 

Great Moravia
9th-century rulers in Europe
9th-century Slavs
9th-century people from East Francia
Slavic warriors